Khalid Mahmood (also spelled Mahmud) may refer to:
 Allama Khalid Mahmood (1925–2020), Islamic scholar and former Justice of Supreme Court of Pakistan (Shariat Appellate Bench).
 Khaled Mahmud (born 1971), Bangladeshi cricketer
 Khalid Mahmood (field hockey) (born 1941), Pakistani field hockey player
 Khalid Mahmood (Norwegian politician) (born 1959)
 Khalid Mahmood (British politician) (born 1961)
 Khalid Mahmood (athlete), Pakistani Paralympic athlete
 Khalid Mahmood (cricketer), Pakistani cricketer
 Khalid Mahmood (umpire), Pakistani cricket umpire
 Khalid Mahmood (Emir of Jamaat-e-Islami Kashmir), Emir of Jamaat-e-Islami Kashmir